Kuwaarjeet Chopra (born 26 July 1990) is an Indian actor who appears in Hindi films.

Early life

He did his schooling from Delhi and then went to Lucknow to study Engineering and then moved to chennai for MBA from Loyola college. During his school and college days he would do street plays on social issues. After completing his education he decided to pursue his passion and love for cinema. So he moved to Mumbai and took professional training from Barry John. Then he joined a theatre group where he honed his skills under the guidance of famous writer and poet Gulzar. 
His paternal grandfather, U. N. Chopra (Omiji) was a Director and his Great Grandfather padmabhushan Krishan Chander was a much translated writer of novels and short stories. He also was a producer and many movies derived inspiration from his novels.

Career

 He was trained by Barry John and honed his skills doing theatre with Salim Arif on stories written by Gulzar and Javed Siddiqui.
 His love for theatre always kept him rooted and busy

Filmography

See also
List of Indian film actors

References

External links
 

Indian male film actors
Living people
Male actors in Hindi cinema
Punjabi people
People from Delhi
21st-century Indian male actors
1990 births